is a Japan-exclusive adventure game developed by Natsume and published by Towa Chiki in 1989 for the Family Computer.

Plot
Sick and bedridden, the zaibatsu tycoon Tomiko senses that her death is near and must nominate an heir among her three granddaughters. To decide who will receive her whole fortune, she launches a challenge: whoever will give her best in the next three months will be the winner. Shizuka, the oldest granddaughter and owner of several business companies, and Reika, the second oldest and a genius scientist, are sure that it's going to be a battle between the two of them. However, Erika, the youngest, has a plan of her own: using her only talent, singing, she aims to break through as a super idol and to do so, she must first seek the help of seven other companions.

Meanwhile, a mysterious man called Dark Lord Iromono is on Erika's track, plotting to have her join his army and become an iromono talent instead.

Gameplay
Erika, an aspiring musician and pop idol, must foil a plot that could ruin her music career. As a Japanese adventure game, players must select through menus of dialogue in order to determine her future. Friends (and sometimes rivals) of Erika give her advice on what to do next. The game's storytelling is remarkable for its hectic and humorous content, which often reflects on the nature of the in-game puzzles.

There are six songs in the game; all of them belonging to the J-pop genre. Erika must master them all in order to become the greatest idol in all of Japan. Lyrics are not sung by a voice actor; they are shown on the bottom of the screen instead.

References

1989 video games
Adventure games
1980s interactive fiction
Japan-exclusive video games
Natsume (company) games
Nintendo Entertainment System games
Nintendo Entertainment System-only games
Towa Chiki games
Video games developed in Japan
Video games featuring female protagonists
Video games scored by Kiyohiro Sada